Okan Suleiman (born 4 March 2000) is a Greek professional footballer who plays as a forward for Gamma Ethniki club Tilikratis

References

2000 births
Living people
Greek footballers
Greek people of Turkish descent
Super League Greece players
Football League (Greece) players
Xanthi F.C. players
Kavala F.C. players
Association football forwards
Footballers from Xanthi